Anton dela Paz (born June 6, 1986) is a Filipino TV personality. He was one of the finalists of the first season of StarStruck. Dela Paz, together with those who were eliminated at the course of the show are now known as Starstruck Batch 1 Avengers.

Career

StarStruck

StarStruck was first announced on the GMA Network Sunday entertainment program SOP, where the hosts invited teenagers to audition for the upcoming StarStruck season. Much of the auditions were held at SM Supermalls throughout the Philippines.
The first season of StarStruck was then directed by Lino Cayetano, and was hosted by Dingdong Dantes and Nancy Castiglione. The council, which guides the finalists throughout the competition are composed of Joey De Leon, Ida Henares and Bb. Joyce Bernal.
The pilot episode aired on October 27, 2003. Out of thousands who auditioned for a stab at stardom, the initial cut of 100 was reduced to 60, from 60 to 30 and from 30 to only 14 teens as finalists. The Final Fourteen underwent various workshops and trainings in order to compare their personalities, talents, etc.
The twist is that every week, one of the Final 14 may have to bid goodbye until only four remain. Those who were eliminated were dubbed as "StarStruck Avengers". The Final Four Survivors will vie for the coveted "Ultimate Survivor" title.

Anton initially did not make it to the Final 14 where these teen candidates will be now the official finalists. However, one of the male finalists named Rico decided to quit and instead pursue his studies. Since he was the 8th guy contestant, that allowed Anton to be included in the Final 14.

dela Paz performed well in his entire run in the said competition. However, in the second week of training which was the "Dancing Week", having Douglas Nierras as their mentor of that week, Anton was included in the StarStruck's so called "Bottom Group" where one of the finalists in that group will be eliminated. He was able to be saved in that week leaving Cristine Reyes in the line allowing her to go home.

In the next week, dela Paz was once again included in the bottom group with Jennylyn Mercado and Tyron Perez†. Jennylyn and Tyron were called as safe for that week, leaving dela Paz on the stage and thus it made him to be the 3rd finalist being sent home.

Post StarStruck
Anton was paired up with Cristine Reyes during the run of "Stage 1: The StarStruck Playhouse" and "Stage 1: LIVE!" where the Final 14 were able to showcase their talents in acting and to portray different roles.

In 2007, dela Paz was cast in an experimental soap opera from as it is the first series in the Philippines to use the genre of suspense-thriller named La Vendetta where he joined his StarStruck mate, Jennylyn Mercado.

De la Paz is currently working at Philippine Airlines as a flight attendant for its domestic network.

Filmography

Television

Movie

References

External links

1986 births
Filipino male television actors
Living people
Male actors from Manila
Participants in Philippine reality television series
StarStruck (Philippine TV series) participants
GMA Network personalities